The 2002 Vanderbilt Commodores football team represented the Vanderbilt University in the 2002 NCAA Division I-A football season.  Led by head coach Bobby Johnson in his first year as the head coach, the Commodores finished with a 2–10 record for the season.

Schedule

Game summaries

Georgia Tech

Scoring Summary

Roster

Team players drafted into the NFL

References

Vanderbilt
Vanderbilt Commodores football seasons
Vanderbilt Commodores football